William Temple may refer to:

 Sir William Temple (logician) (1555–1627), English Ramist logician and Provost of Trinity College, Dublin
 Sir William Temple, 1st Baronet (1628–1699), English diplomat, politician and essayist, employer of Jonathan Swift
 William Johnson Temple (1739–1796), English cleric and essayist, a correspondent of James Boswell
 William Temple (governor) (1814–1863), American merchant and Governor of Delaware
 William Temple (VC) (1833–1919), Irish recipient of the Victoria Cross
 William Chase Temple (1862–1917), American coal and lumber baron, owner of the Pittsburgh Pirates
 William Temple (bishop) (1881–1944), Archbishop of York and Archbishop of Canterbury
 William Horace Temple (1899–1988), Canadian temperance crusader, businessman, CCF member of the Ontario Legislature, 1948–1951
 William F. Temple (1914–1989), British science fiction writer
 Bill Temple (footballer), (1914–2006), English footballer